Pickeringia is a monotypic genus of flowering plants in the legume family, Fabaceae. It was recently assigned to the unranked, monophyletic Cladrastis clade. It was named after the naturalist Charles Pickering. Its only species is Pickeringia montana, which is known by the common name chaparral pea. It is endemic to California in the United States, where its distribution extends along the Coast Ranges to the Peninsular Ranges, as well as along the Sierra Nevada foothills. It is also known from Santa Cruz Island.

It is one of very few legumes native to the chaparral habitat. Its nitrogen-fixing ability helps it thrive in rocky, sandy soil. The plant is also well-suited to a landscape of hills, slopes, and recently burned areas; its roots spread quickly and help anchor loose soil, preventing erosion.

Description
The chaparral pea rarely sprouts from seed. More often it sends up new stems from roots growing outward from the mother plant. It forms low, dense, thorny thickets of shiny dark green leaves. In spring and summer the plant blooms in bright magenta flowers. It bears pods containing pealike seeds.

There are two subspecies of chaparral pea:
 Pickeringia montana subsp. montana is widespread in California.
 Pickeringia montana subsp. tomentosa, sometimes called woolly chaparral pea, is limited to the hills of southern California.

References

External links

USDA Plants Profile; Pickeringia montana 
Jepson Manual Treatment - Pickeringia montana

Faboideae
Endemic flora of California
Natural history of the California chaparral and woodlands
Monotypic Fabaceae genera